Karbalay Baqer Kandi (also Romanized as Karbalāy Bāqer Kandī; also known as ʿAdal Kandī) is a village in Gejlarat-e Sharqi Rural District, Aras District, Poldasht County, West Azerbaijan Province, Iran. At the 2006 census, its population was 243, in 52 families.

References 

Populated places in Poldasht County